Isolate – The Numa Years is a compilation album by Gary Numan. It was released in March 1992 on CD and cassette and contains tracks issued on his own Numa Records label during the years 1984–1986. The songs (mainly in their extended or long forms) are taken from the albums Berserker, The Fury and Strange Charm. The four page insert contains printed lyrics to all the tracks.

CD copies of this album are known to suffer from CD bronzing.

Track listing
"My Breathing" – 6:35
"Call Out the Dogs" – 6:41
"Emotion" – 8:00
"My Dying Machine" – 9:04
"Time to Die" – 4:08
"Berserker" – 6:04
"Your Fascination" – 5:10
"The Secret" – 6:40
"Creatures" – 6:36
"This Is Love" – 4:29

Notes
"Time to Die" was originally exclusive to the cassette version of Strange Charm and also appeared as the b-side to the Sharpe and Numan single New Thing From London Town.
"This is Love" is incorrectly listed as being from Berserker instead of Strange Charm.

References

1992 compilation albums
Gary Numan compilation albums